Gregg Foggo (date of birth is Paget, Bermuda) is a former Bermudian cricketer. Foggo's batting and bowling styles are unknown.

Foggo made his debut for Bermuda in a List A match against Jamaica in the 1997/98 Red Stripe Bowl, with him making a further List A appearance in that tournament against the same opposition. He scored a total of 8 runs in his two List A matches, while with the ball he bowled a total of 6.5 overs without taking a wicket.

References

External links
Gregg Foggo at ESPNcricinfo
Gregg Foggo at CricketArchive

Living people
Bermudian cricketers
1970 births